Commemorative currency in the Kyrgyz Republic is the set of commemorative banknotes and coins, issued by the National Bank of the Kyrgyz Republic, that are not meant for general circulation. 

All the banknotes and coins are either denoted by som, the underlined C, or its subunit the tyiyn. 

Kyrgyz is the language used on the commemorative currencies, although Russian, and to a lesser extent English, is used in conjunction as well.

Issuing of Commemorative Currencies
The central bank regularly issues commemorative currencies to mark various occasions, or to celebrate the various aspects of Kyrgyzstani culture or wildlife. 

Several of these have also won numerous regional and international awards.

Production of Commemorative Currencies
Commemorative coins are minted in several locations including, Kazakhstan, Lithuania, Poland, Russia (Saint Petersburg Mint), Slovakia, and the United Kingdom (Pobjoy Mint), while the commemorative notes are printed in the United States (Crane Currency).

History
On 11 August 1995, the central bank issued its first collectible coins to celebrate the 1000th anniversary of the Epic of Manas, despite coins not being in general circulation at that time. Since then, over the years, the central bank has increased the frequency of issuance of commemorative currencies. 

The central bank reached its first major milestone when it received its first award on the 1st of December 2010. 

The commemorative coins of the 2009 "Works of Chinghiz Aitmatov" series won an Honorary Diploma from the "Biblio-Globus" Trading House during the fourth international commemorative coin competition. 

In 2017, the first commemorative banknote was issued. This banknote was also the first vertically oriented Kyrgyz banknote that had incorporated several state of the art security features, although machines were not calibrated to accept these notes. 

In 2018 with the introduction of the new som symbol to mark 25 years of issuing the national currency, new commemorative currencies started featuring the symbol as well.

Commemorative coins

Commemorative banknotes

Awards

See also

 National Bank of the Kyrgyz Republic
 Kyrgyzstani som

References

Economy of Kyrgyzstan
Commemorative banknotes
Lists of commemorative coins